Lonely Avenue is the debut album by American jazz vibraphonist Freddie McCoy which was recorded in 1965 for the Prestige label.

Reception

Allmusic rated the album 3 stars.

Track listing
All compositions by Freddie McCoy except where noted.
 "Lonely Avenue" (Doc Pomus) – 2:25    
 "Roëll" – 4:20   
 "Collard Greens" – 2:30    
 "When Sunny Gets Blue" (Jack Segal, Marvin Fischer) – 4:35
 "Harlem Nocturne" (Earle Hagen, Dick Rogers) – 4:25     
 "Willow Weep for Me" (Ann Ronell) – 3:40    
 "Belly Full of Greens" – 2:30
 "Feeling Good" (Anthony Newley, Leslie Bricusse) – 3:00
Recorded at Van Gelder Studio in Englewood Cliffs, New Jersey on January 25 (tracks 1-4) and February 16 (tracks 5-8), 1965

Personnel 
Freddie McCoy – vibraphone 
Gil Askey – trumpet, arranger
Tate Houston – baritone saxophone
Dickie Harris – trombone (tracks 5-8)
James Thomas – organ
Napoleon Allen – guitar (tracks 1-4)
Martin Rivera – bass
Ray Lucas – drums

References 

1965 debut albums
Freddie McCoy albums
Prestige Records albums
Albums recorded at Van Gelder Studio
Albums produced by Cal Lampley